Aydın Aybay (1929 – 6 March 2013) was a Turkish professor of law, writer and lawyer. He was one of the founders of the Istanbul University Faculty of Political Sciences, the Maltepe University Faculty of Law and the Cumhuriyet Foundation.

Biography 
Aydın Aybay was born in Istanbul. He graduated from Istanbul University Faculty of Law in 1953. In the same year, he started his academic career as a research assistant at department of civil law. He earned Doctor of Law degree in 1958 at the same faculty. He became associate professor (doçent) in 1963 and full professor in 1973.

In 1979, he founded Istanbul University Faculty of Political Sciences with his friends. After 1980 coup d'état, military administration sacked Aydın Aybay from university with many other academics. They are against coup d'état. In 1990s, he returned Istanbul University. In 1996, he retired from public university and started to lecture at the Maltepe University.

In January 2010, Aydın Aybay suffered lung cancer. He died of respiratory failure on 6 March 2013 in Istanbul.

References 

1929 births
2013 deaths
Istanbul University Faculty of Law alumni
Academic staff of Istanbul University
20th-century Turkish lawyers
Deaths from respiratory failure
Academic staff of Maltepe University